Carroll "Mike" Reilly (May 7, 1899 – December 31, 1971) was an American football, basketball, and baseball player and coach. He served as the head football (1930–1942), basketball (1928–1943) and baseball (1931–1932) coach at St. Bonaventure University in Allegany, New York. The home basketball arena at St. Bonaventure, the Reilly Center, is named in his honor.

References

1899 births
1971 deaths
St. Bonaventure Bonnies athletic directors
St. Bonaventure Bonnies baseball coaches
St. Bonaventure Bonnies men's basketball coaches
St. Bonaventure Bonnies men's basketball players
St. Bonaventure Brown Indians football coaches
St. Bonaventure Brown Indians football players
American men's basketball players